Penetrator is the eighth studio album by American rock musician Ted Nugent. It was released in January 1984 by Atlantic Records.

"Tied Up in Love" was made into a promo clip to support the album. It reached No. 56 on the Billboard 200 albums chart. The song "(Where Do You) Draw the Line", written by Bryan Adams and Jim Vallance, was originally recorded by Adams for his hit 1984 album Reckless but was left off the final track list. Adams' version eventually saw a release on the 30th anniversary reissue of Reckless.

The cover art is a section of the painting "Dragon Tattoo" by Boris Vallejo.

Reception 

In a largely negative review, John Franck of AllMusic proclaimed Penetrator to be "one of Nugent's most underwhelming releases".

Track listing 
All songs by Ted Nugent, except where indicated.

Personnel 
Band members
 Ted Nugent – guitars, six-string bass, lead vocals on tracks 6, 7, 9, 10
 Brian Howe – lead vocals on tracks 1–5, 8
 Alan St. Jon – keyboards, backing vocals
 Doug Lubahn – bass
 Bobby Chouinard – drums

Additional musicians
 Peter Wolf – percussion, sequencing
 Cynthia Shiloh, Kevin Russell, Rahni Raines, Tod Howarth, Zoe Fox – background vocals

Production
 Ashley Howe – producer, engineer, mixing
 Bill Scheniman – engineer
 Kevin Eddy – engineer, mixing
 Bob Ludwig – mastering
 Doug Banker – executive producer
 Eric Conn – digital remastering

References 

1984 albums
Ted Nugent albums
Atlantic Records albums
Glam metal albums
Albums with cover art by Boris Vallejo